Saluria is a genus of snout moths. It was described by Émile Louis Ragonot in 1887.

Species
 Saluria carnescens Hampson, 1918
 Saluria flavicosta Hampson, 1918
 Saluria hilgerti (Rothschild, 1915)
 Saluria inficita Walker, 1863
 Saluria insignificella Hampson, 1918
 Saluria interpunctella Hampson, 1918
 Saluria jordanella Ragonot, 1888
 Saluria lentistrigella Hampson, 1918
 Saluria maculivittella Ragonot, 1887
 Saluria mesomelanella Hampson, 1918
 Saluria musaeella (Schaus, 1913)
 Saluria nilgiriensis Hampson, 1918
 Saluria nimbelloides de Joannis, 1927
 Saluria ochridorsella Ragonot, 1888
 Saluria pectigerella Ragonot, 1887
 Saluria proleucella Hampson, 1918
 Saluria psammatella Hampson, 1918
 Saluria rhodophaea Hampson, 1918
 Saluria rufella Hampson, 1918
 Saluria semirosella Hampson, 1918
 Saluria stictophora Hampson, 1918
 Saluria subcostella Hampson, 1918
 Saluria tenuicosta Hampson, 1918
 Saluria violodis (Dyar, 1914)

References

Anerastiini
Pyralidae genera
Taxa named by Émile Louis Ragonot